Lydney Town A.F.C. are a football club based in Lydney, Gloucestershire, England. The club is affiliated to the Gloucestershire County FA.

History
The club was formed in 1911 and played in local leagues until 1952 when they joined the Gloucestershire Northern Senior League. The club played in this league until 1969, when due to a lack of a committee the club folded, but was reformed again two seasons later. The club won the Senior League Division One Championship in the 1979–80 season and moved to Division One of the Hellenic league for the 1980–81 season. Four seasons later they left the league and rejoined the Gloucestershire Northern Senior League.

In the 2005–06 season, they won the Gloucestershire County League title, earning promotion back into the Hellenic League Division One West for the 2006–07 season. They won Division one west at the first attempt and were promoted to the Premier Division, but were demoted back to Division one a season later due to not having their floodlights operational in time.

Ground
Lydney Town play their home games at Lydney Recreation Ground, Swan Road, Lydney GL15 5RU.

Honours
Hellenic League Division One West
 Champions (1): 2006–07
Gloucestershire County League
Champions (1): 2005–06
Gloucestershire Northern Senior League 
Champions (1): 1979–80, 2004-05
Champions (1): 1977–78, 1978–79

Current 1st team regular Playing Squad

References

External links
 

Hellenic Football League
Football clubs in Gloucestershire
1911 establishments in England
Association football clubs established in 1911
Lydney
Football clubs in England